Alwyn Martin Johns (17 March 1894 – 14 September 1969) was an Australian rules footballer who played for the Geelong Football Club in the Victorian Football League (VFL).

Notes

External links 
		

1894 births
1969 deaths
Australian rules footballers from Victoria (Australia)
Geelong Football Club players
East Geelong Football Club players